Twerps is a shoot 'em up written by Dan Thompson for the Apple II and published by Sirius Software in 1982. It was ported to the Atari 8-bit family by Joe Kelly.

Gameplay
Twerps is a game in which an explorer ship with its crew of nine Twerps crashed on an asteroid, and Captain Twerp must rescue the stranded Twerps.

Reception
Mark Bausman reviewed the game for Computer Gaming World, and stated that "This game will provide a pleasant diversion for children and adults alike."

References

External links
Review in Softline
Review in Creative Computing
Article in Practical Computing

1982 video games
Apple II games
Atari 8-bit family games
Sirius Software games
Shoot 'em ups
Space flight simulator games
Video games about extraterrestrial life
Video games developed in the United States